The 2022 Jacksonville State Gamecocks football team represented Jacksonville State University in the 2022 NCAA Division I FCS football season. The Gamecocks competed in the ASUN Conference after the ASUN added football, scheduled for 2022. Led by first-year head coach Rich Rodriguez, Jacksonville State compiled an overall record of 9–2 with mark of 5–0 in conference play. The Gamecocks were ineligible for FCS postseason play and ASUN title due their transition to the NCAA Division I Football Bowl Subdivision (FBS). The team played home games at Burgess–Snow Field at JSU Stadium in Jacksonville, Alabama. 

On November 5, 2021, Jacksonsville State announced the football team will join Conference USA in 2023.

Schedule

Game summaries

vs. No. 10 Stephen F. Austin

Davidson

at Murray State

at Tulsa

at Nicholls

Kennesaw State

vs. North Alabama

Southeastern Louisiana

at No. 25 Austin Peay

Eastern Kentucky

at Central Arkansas

References

Jacksonville State
Jacksonville State Gamecocks football seasons
ASUN Conference football champion seasons
Jacksonville State Gamecocks football